Viborg station ( or Viborg Banegård) is a railway station serving the city of Viborg in Jutland, Denmark.

Viborg station is located on the Langå-Struer Line from Langå to Struer. The station was opened in 1863 with the opening of the Langå-Viborg section of the Langå-Struer Line. It was moved to its current location in 1896. It offers direct InterCity services to Copenhagen and Struer as well as regional train services to Aarhus and Struer. The train services are operated by Arriva and DSB.

History 

The station opened in 1863 to serve as terminus of the new railway line from Langå to Viborg. In 1864, the railway line was continued to Skive and in 1865 to Struer. In 1893, Viborg station also became the southern terminus of the new Viborg-Aalestrup railway line, which connected with the Hobro-Aalestrup-Løgstør Line a month later.

The original Viborg station was a terminal station, and trains arriving there had to end their journeys (terminate) or reverse out of the station. In 1896, however, the station was moved to its present location and the current station building was built.

In 1906, the Herning-Viborg Line opened, followed by the Viborg-Faarup-Mariager Line in 1927. The Mariager Line was closed in 1965 and the Herning Line in 1971, while passenger traffic on the Viborg-Aalestrup Line stopped in 1966, with freight service on the line between Viborg and Løgstør continuing until 1999.

Operations

Train services 
The train services are currently operated by Arriva which run frequent local train services from Viborg station to Struer and Aarhus Central Station. Additionally, DSB operates a twice daily direct inter city service to Struer and Copenhagen.

References

Citations

Bibliography

External links

 Banedanmark – government agency responsible for maintenance and traffic control of most of the Danish railway network
 DSB – largest Danish train operating company
 Arriva – British multinational public transport company operating bus and train services in Denmark
 Danske Jernbaner – website with information on railway history in Denmark

Railway stations opened in 1863
Railway stations in the Central Denmark Region
Railway stations in Denmark opened in the 19th century